This is a list of notable Lebanese Canadians; individuals born in Canada of Lebanese ancestry, or people of Lebanese and Canadian dual nationality who live or lived in Canada.

Academics and scholars 
 Henry Habib - political scientist
 Gad Saad - evolutionary behavioral scientist
 Justine Sergent - neuroscientist

Actors
 Emeraude Toubia - actress 
 Garen Boyajian - actor 
 Arsinée Khanjian - actress; wife of film director Atom Egoyan
 Keanu Reeves - actor
 Sandra Shamas - actress and writer
 Jade Hassouné - actor and dancer
 Ty Wood - actor and model.

Athletes
 Fouad Abiad - former IFBB professional bodybuilder
 David Azzi - professional soccer player
 Jo-Anne Beaumier - international soccer player
 Gabriel Bitar - professional soccer player
 Ali Haidar - college basketball player (Michigan Tech Huskies)
 John Hanna - former professional hockey player
 Ed Hatoum - former professional hockey player (Vancouver Canucks)
 Fabian Joseph - former professional hockey player (Canada men's national ice hockey team)
 Nazem Kadri - professional hockey player (Toronto Maple Leafs)
 Ali Kanaan - basketball player and member of Lebanon's national basketball team
 David Lemieux - professional boxer
 Ali Mahmoud - basketball player and member of Lebanon's national basketball team
 John Makdessi - professional mixed martial arts (MMA) fighter
 Tony Mikhael - professional soccer player
 Alain Nasreddine - former professional ice hockey player
 Jean Sayegh - water polo player
 Omar El Turk - basketball player and member of Lebanon's national basketball team

Business
 Jeff Hammoud - car designer
 Charles Khabouth - hospitality entrepreneur; founder and CEO of INK Entertainment
 Assad Kotaite (1924-2014) - former Secretary-General and Council President of the International Civil Aviation Organization from 1976 to 2006
 Kevin O'Leary - entrepreneur and reality television personality (Dragons' Den, Shark Tank)
Ablan Leon - founder of Leon's furniture company in 1901 in Welland, Ontario.
Elias Geha - founder of G.E.G. Web in Montréal, Canada.

Entertainment
 Marc Karam - professional poker player

Film and television
 Amber Fares - filmmaker, documentarian, director
 Donald Shebib - fiction and documentary film and television director, editor, and screenwriter
 Ziad Touma -  film director, producer, and screenwriter

Musicians
 Paul Anka - singer and composer
 Steve Barakatt - composer & pianist
 Isabel Bayrakdarian – soprano of Lebanese Armenian origin
 Norman Brooks - singer
 Patrick Gemayel, stage name "P-Thugg" - member of musical act Chromeo
 K.Maro - rapper
 Joyce El-Khoury - opera singer
 Andy Kim - singer and songwriter
 Kristina Maria - singer
 Mark Masri - pop and religious singer
 Massari - pop and hip-hop singer
 Omar Mouallem, also known as A.O.K. (Assault Of Knowledge) - rapper
 Julie Nesrallah - opera singer, radio broadcaster
 Tony Sal -  music manager
 Noah "40" Shebib - producer, songwriter, and music executive
 Karl Wolf - singer, songwriter and producer

Painters
 Philip Aziz - painter and artist
 Ayah Bdeir - interactive artist and engineer
 Jay Isaac - visual artist

Politicians

Federal
 Ziad Aboultaif - Federal MP, Conservative (2015- )
 Mark Assad - Federal MP, Liberal (1997-2004) and Quebec MNA, Liberal (1981–1988)
 Pierre de Bané - Federal MP, Liberal (1968-1984) and Federal Senator, Liberal (1984-2013)
 Michael Basha - Federal Senator, Liberal (1951-1976)
 Fonse Faour - Federal MP, NDP (1978-1980) and Provincial Newfoundland and Labrador NDP Leader (1980-1981)
 Mac Harb - Federal MP, Liberal (1988–2003) and Federal Senator, Liberal (2006-2013) 
 Fayçal El-Khoury, Federal MP, Liberal (2015- )
 Allan Koury - Federal MP, Conservative (1988-1993)
 Maria Mourani - Federal MP, Bloc Quebecois (2003–2015)
 Eva Nassif - Federal MP, Liberal (2015-2019)
 Alain Rayes - Federal MP, Conservative (2015- ) and Mayor of Victoriaville, Quebec (2009-2015)
 Marwan Tabbara - Federal MP, Liberal (2015-2021)
 Sam Wakim - Federal MP, Conservative (1979-1980)
 Paul Zed - Federal MP, Liberal (1993-1997, 2004-2008)

Provincial
 Patricia Arab - Nova Scotia MLA, Liberal (2013–present)
 David Boushy - Ontario MPP, Conservative (1995-1999)
 Zach Churchill - Nova Scotia MLA, Liberal (2010–present)
 Lena Diab - Nova Scotia MLA, Liberal  (2013–present)
 Joe Ghiz - PEI MLA, Liberal; Premier of Prince Edward Island (1986–1993)
 Robert Ghiz - PEI MLA, Liberal; Premier of Prince Edward Island (2007–2015)
 Lorraine Michael - Newfoundland and Labrador MLA, NDP (2006-Current) and Provincial Newfoundland and Labrador NDP Leader (2006-2015)
 Khalil Ramal - Ontario MPP, Liberal (2003-2011)
 Larry Shaben - Alberta MLA, Conservative (1975-1989)

Municipal
 Walter Assef - Mayor of Thunder Bay, Ontario (1973-1978, 1981-1985)
 Harout Chitilian - City councillor and former Chairman of the City Council of Montreal (2009- )
 Eddie Francis - Mayor of Windsor, Ontario (2003-2014)
 Marceil Saddy - Mayor of Sarnia, Ontario (1980-1988)

Writers
 John Asfour - poet and writer
 Shaunt Basmajian - poet
 Rawi Hage - writer
 Ann-Marie MacDonald - author, actor, playwright
 Wajdi Mouawad - poet and writer
 Trish Salah - poet and sociologist

Others
 Fauzi Ayub (1966–2014), influential member of Hezbollah
 Salah Bachir (born 1955), Canadian philanthropist, patron of the arts, entrepreneur, magazine publisher and the President of Cineplex Media
 Doris Daou - Lebanese-born Canadian astronomer; one of NASA's leading experts in education and public outreach
 Mohammed Hassan Dbouk - journalist and alleged member of Hezbollah
 Karim Habib - automotive designer currently working for the BMW group
 Jeff Hammoud - automotive designer currently working for Chrysler

See also
Lebanese Canadians
Arab Canadian
Canada–Lebanon relations
List of Lebanese people
List of Lebanese people (Diaspora)
Lebanese American

References

Canada
Lebanese People

Lebanese